SCH-79687 is a histamine antagonist selective for the H3 subtype.

References

Chloroarenes
H3 receptor antagonists
Imidazoles
Ureas